Vaishnav Girish (born 21 June 2002) is an Indian singer and live performer. He has appeared in several singing reality TV shows and has recorded songs for films in Malayalam language. Vaishnav rose to fame when his audition for the 2017 season of Zee TV's musical talent hunt show Sa Re Ga Ma Pa L'il Champs became a viral video online, and led to a nationwide press coverage. He went on to finish the competition as runner up.

Personal life 
Vaishnav was born in Kodungallur, a town in the Thrissur district of Kerala on June 21, 2002. He is the youngest son of A.K Girish Kumar, a retired officer at Canara Bank and Mini V Menon, a lawyer in the High Court of Kerala. He developed interest in music, listening to his brother Krishnanunni Girish learn Indian classical music. A former vocalist of the Thrissur based alternative rock band 1000cc, Krishnanunni inspired him to take up singing as a career. At the age of four, he started formal training in Carnatic music from Pavithran Kodungallur and continued further training for school competitions and reality television shows under Noushad Kodungallur and Cherthala Shaji.

Vaishnav attended Holy Grace Academy, Mala and St. Joseph’s Higher Secondary School, Mathilakam. During his time at Holy Grace Academy, he was awarded the Kalaprathibha title at the CBSE State Kalotsav for two consecutive years (2013 and 2014). He also secured grade A for Light Music, Ghazal and Urdu group song events at 58th Kerala School Kalolsavam held in 2017.

Career 
Vaishnav competed in Surya TV's Surya Singer 2, a Malayalam music reality show in 2014, where he emerged the winner. In 2015, his participation in the second edition of Indian reality television singing competition Indian Idol Junior, earned him recognition. Universal Music India (UMI) signed a two-year record deal with him before he finished the competition as the third runner-up.

After Vaishnav's audition for the sixth season of Sa Re Ga Ma Pa Li'l Champs, singing “Bin Tere” (from the Hindi film, I Hate Luv Storys), went viral online in July 2017, he was featured in Indian Express, Times of India, Mathrubhumi among others, bringing him wider fame in India. He received praise from the judges and audiences alike for the performance and finished runner-up of the competition.

In 2018, Vaishnav made his debut as a playback singer with the Malayalam film, “Ankarajyathe Jimmanmar”, composed by Girish Nayanan. He was a contestant in the 2020 edition of popular reality television show Indian Idol, but got eliminated.

Awards 
 CBSE State Kalotsav - Kalaprathibha (2013, 2014)
 Surya Singer Season 2 - Winner (2014)
 Kerala School Kalolsavam - Grade A for Light Music & Ghazal (2017)

Discography

References

External links 
 
 Facebook

2002 births
Living people
21st-century Indian male singers
21st-century Indian singers
Singers from Thrissur
Malayalam playback singers